The Amazing Adventures of Simon Simon is a jazz album by British saxophonist John Surman and American drummer Jack DeJohnette. It was recorded in January 1981 at the Talent Studio, Oslo. The album cover is chosen by designer Storm Thorgerson as one of 100 best album covers.

Track list

Personnel
 John Surman: baritone saxophone, soprano saxophone, bass clarinet, synthesizer
 Jack DeJohnette: drums, congas, electric piano
 Artwork design: Susan Nash
 Engineer: Jan Erik Kongshaug
 Photography: Christian Vogt, Gérard Amsellem

References

External links 
 The Amazing Adventures of Simon Simon at discogs.com

1981 albums
John Surman albums
ECM Records albums
Albums produced by Manfred Eicher